Camille Thompson (born 13 August 1971) is a Canadian basketball player. She competed in the women's tournament at the 1996 Summer Olympics.

Awards and honors
Top 100 U Sports women's basketball Players of the Century (1920-2020).

References

External links
 

1971 births
Living people
Canadian women's basketball players
Olympic basketball players of Canada
Basketball players at the 1996 Summer Olympics
People from Salmon Arm